Ali Asghar Khodadoust
(27 October 1935 – 10 March 2018) was an Iranian eye surgeon specializing in corneal transplantation, in whose honor the Khodadoust rejection line is named. He worked at different eye clinics in the U.S. like the Wilmer Eye Institute at the Johns Hopkins School of Medicine  and at the Connecticut Ophthalmology Center in New Haven. His medical reputation was the result of his extensive studies on corneal diseases and transplantation biology.

Death
Khodadoust died at NewYork–Presbyterian Hospital in New York City on March 9, 2018. He was 82.

References

External links
 https://web.archive.org/web/20110707183747/http://www.atlasophthalmology.com/atlas/photo.jsf;?node=6888&locale=en
 http://www.nature.com/eye/journal/v4/n5/abs/eye199097a.html
 http://health.usnews.com/doctors/ali-khodadoust-218909
 http://www.aimjournal.ir/pdffiles/38_jun2013_0014.pdf 

1935 births
2018 deaths
Iranian ophthalmologists
People from Shiraz